Sunil Prajapati is a Nepalese politician who is the current mayor of Bhaktapur, belonging to the Nepal Workers Peasants Party.

In the 1999 parliamentary election Prajapati contested the Bhaktapur 2 constituency. He finished second with 13,432 votes.

After the fall of King Gyanendra's direct rule in 2006, Prajapati was nominated to the interim legislature of Nepal. Prajapati became a member of the Interim Constitution Drafting Committee.

In April 2008, he won the Bhaktapur-2 seat in the Constituent Assembly election.

Electoral history

See also
Kumhar
Prajapati

References

Living people
Nepal Workers Peasants Party politicians
Year of birth missing (living people)
Mayors of places in Nepal
Members of the 1st Nepalese Constituent Assembly